Wheaton College is a private Evangelical Christian liberal arts college in Wheaton, Illinois. It was founded by evangelical abolitionists in 1860. Wheaton College was a stop on the Underground Railroad and graduated one of Illinois' first black college graduates.

History
Wheaton College was founded in 1860. Its predecessor, the Illinois Institute, had been founded in late 1853 by Wesleyan Methodists as a college and preparatory school. Wheaton's first president, Jonathan Blanchard, was a former president of Knox College in Galesburg, Illinois and a staunch abolitionist with ties to Oberlin College. Mired in financial trouble and unable to sustain the institution, the Wesleyans looked to Blanchard for new leadership. He took on the role as president in 1860, having suggested several Congregationalist appointees to the board of trustees the previous year. The Wesleyans, similar in spirit and mission to the Congregationalists, were happy to relinquish control of the Illinois Institute. Blanchard officially separated the college from any denominational support and was responsible for its new name, given in honor of trustee and benefactor Warren L. Wheaton, who founded the town of Wheaton after moving to Illinois from New England.

A dogged reformer, Blanchard began his public campaign for abolitionism with the American Anti-Slavery Society in 1836, at the age of twenty-five. Later in his life, after the Civil War, he began a sustained campaign against Freemasonry. This culminated in a national presidential campaign on the American Anti-Masonic Party ticket in 1884.

Under Blanchard's leadership, the college was a stop on the Underground Railroad. The confirmation came from the letters of Ezra Cook, one of Blanchard's relatives by marriage, who notes that the town and college's anti-slavery beliefs were so widely held that he, along with hundreds of other Wheaton residents, had seen and spoken with many fugitive slaves.

Blanchard consistently lobbied for universal co-education and was a strong proponent of reform through strong public education open to all. At this time, Wheaton was the only school in Illinois with a college-level women's program. Also, Wheaton saw its first graduate of color in 1866, when Edward Breathitte Sellers took his degree. Additionally, he is one of the first African-American college graduates in Illinois.
In 1882, Charles A. Blanchard succeeded his father as president of the college.

In 1925, J. Oliver Buswell, an outspoken Presbyterian, delivered a series of lectures at Wheaton College. Shortly after that, President Charles Blanchard died, and Buswell was called to be the third president of Wheaton. Upon his installation in April 1926, he became the nation's youngest college president at age 31. Buswell's tenure was characterized by expanding enrollment (from approximately 400 in 1925 to 1,100 in 1940), a building program, strong academic development, and a boom in the institution's reputation. It was also known for growing divisiveness over faculty scholarship and personality clashes. In 1940, this tension led to the firing of Buswell for being, as two college historians put it, "too argumentative in temperament and too intellectual in his approach to Christianity." By the late 1940s, Wheaton was emerging as a standard-bearer of Evangelicalism.

By 1950, enrollment at the college had surpassed 1,600. In the second half of the twentieth century, enrollment growth and more selective admissions accompanied athletic success, additional and improved facilities, and expanded programs.

In 1951, Honey Rock, a camp in Three Lakes, Wisconsin, was purchased by the college.

In 2010, the public phase of The Promise of Wheaton campaign came to a close with $250.7 million raised, an "unprecedented 5-1/2 year campaign figure for Wheaton College".

In 2010, Wheaton College became the first American Associate University of the Tony Blair Faith Foundation's Faith and Globalization Initiative. Tony Blair noted that the partnership will "give emerging leaders in the United States and the United Kingdom the opportunity to explore in depth the critical issues of how faith impacts the modern world today through different faith and cultural lenses" and that Wheaton's participation will "greatly enrich the Initiative".

, the college continued to retain its Christian "Statement of Faith and Educational Purpose" and expected public statements of its faculty members to conform to it.

Presidents
Jonathan Blanchard (1860–1882)
Charles A. Blanchard (1882–1925)
J. Oliver Buswell (1926–1940)
V. Raymond Edman (1941–1965)
Hudson Armerding (1965–1982)
J. Richard Chase (1982–1993)
A. Duane Litfin (1993–2010)
Philip G. Ryken (2010–present)

Academics

The Higher Learning Commission accredits Wheaton College.

According to The Princeton Review's "The Best 351 Colleges", "If the integration of faith and learning is what you want out of a college, Wheaton is arguably the best school in the nation with a Christ-based worldview." Students may choose from about 40 majors in many liberal arts disciplines and in the sciences. The most popular undergraduate majors, based on 2021 graduates, were:
Business/Managerial Economics (64)
Psychology (46)
Biology/Biological Sciences (33)
English Language and Literature (30)
Elementary Education and Teaching (28)
Health Services/Allied Health/Health Sciences (28)
International Relations and Affairs (28)

The college is ranked 3rd most LGBTQ-unfriendly campus by The Princeton Review in its 2020 rankings of the 386 American campuses that it surveys.

In 2015, U.S. News & World Report ranked Wheaton College at 56 out of 265 Best National Liberal Arts Colleges. Wheaton continued to achieve high rankings in several areas of the report:
 No. 15 in freshmen retention (95.0%) (2009 Report)
 No. 21 in six-year graduation rate (86%) (2007 Report)
 No. 25 in SAT/ACT scores (1250–1440) (2007 Report)
 No. 39 in the percentage of first-year students graduating in the top 10 percent of their high-school classes (54%) (2007 Report)

Wheaton College ranked ninth in the nation in the total number of graduates (all fields) who went on to earn doctorates (during the period of 1986–1995) according to Franklin & Marshall College's latest survey, which included more than 900 private colleges and universities.

Throughout 2010-2020, Wheaton College ranked 18th in the National Center for Science and Engineering Statistics' survey of baccalaureate-origin institutions of non-Science-and-Engineering doctorate recipients. This ranking uses an institutional yield weighted by an institution's number of graduates.

Forbes magazine ranked Wheaton College 75th in their annual list of 650 best undergraduate institutions and gave Wheaton a financial grade of "A". Forbes also lists Wheaton among the Top 100 ROI Colleges in 2014.

Conservatory of Music

Wheaton College is home to a Conservatory of Music accredited by the National Association of Schools of Music. The conservatory offers two professional music degrees: the Bachelor of Music (with emphases in performance, Suzuki pedagogy, composition, history, and literature, conducting, collaborative piano, or elective studies) and the Bachelor of Music Education. All of the teaching faculty in the conservatory hold doctorates. There are approximately 200 music majors in the conservatory, with a student-faculty ratio of 7:1. Music majors and liberal arts majors alike perform in the conservatory's six large ensembles: concert choir, jazz ensemble, men's glee club, symphonic band, symphony orchestra, and women's chorale. Graduates include conductor John Nelson, Grammy Award-winning American soprano Sylvia McNair, and Wendy White of the Metropolitan Opera.

Artist Series
The Artist Series at Wheaton College, operating under the umbrella of the Conservatory of Music, is a subscription concert series that brings world-class performers to the Wheaton College community. Previous Artist Series performers include the Chicago Symphony Orchestra, the Royal Philharmonic Orchestra, Lorin Maazel and the Symphonica Toscanini, Ladysmith Black Mambazo, the Canadian Brass, and the Royal Scots Dragoon Guards & Band of the Coldstream Guard. The Artist Series frequently partners with Wheaton College Conservatory graduates, including the soprano Sylvia McNair and the conductor John Nelson.

Graduate school
The Wheaton College Graduate School was founded in 1937 to provide further theological training and ministry skills. The college and graduate school are on an 80-acre campus in Wheaton, Illinois, a 45-minute train ride west of downtown Chicago. There are approximately 550 graduate students enrolled, with a 14:1 student/faculty ratio.

The graduate school comprises six academic departments; Biblical and Theological Studies, Christian Formation & Ministry, Evangelism and Leadership, Intercultural Studies, Psychology, and Teaching. The Graduate School offers 14 Master of Arts programs and two doctoral programs, a Ph.D. in Biblical & Theological Studies and a Psy.D. in Clinical Psychology. The American Psychological Association and Council for the Accreditation of Educator Preparation accredit graduate school programs.

Five of the master's programs provide a flexible degree option. Wheaton offers a Biblical Studies program as a part-time, evening cohort model. The school offers Missional Church Movements and TESOL and Intercultural Studies in a summer-only format. The college also offers an Evangelism & Leadership the Christian Formation and Ministry – Outdoor and Adventure Ministry concentration in a year-round modular format.

Off-campus study
Wheaton gives students several off-campus study opportunities.

The college sponsors study-abroad programs in Asia, England, France, Germany, Israel, Latin America, and Spain, as well as a summer program in Washington, D.C. Participants in Wheaton-in-England, one of the most popular annual programs, take 2–3 courses in literature while studying in London and St. Anne's College, Oxford.

Many students also participate in the Human Needs and Global Resources program. The HNGR program matches select students with six-month internships in the Third World, including opportunities in Africa, Asia, and Latin America.

Wheaton also sponsors a semester-long, experiential, residential program called Wheaton in Chicago. In Chicago, students complete internships and take advanced interdisciplinary coursework. Founded in 1998, it has enrolled students from more than 20 majors.

In 1935, Wheaton established the Wheaton College Science Station in the Black Hills of South Dakota for field instruction in the natural sciences.

In 1951, HoneyRock, the outdoor center for leadership development at Wheaton College, was established in Three Lakes, Wisconsin. HoneyRock is not only a year-round camp for young people, but it offers a variety of leadership schools and courses for students. Nearly 3000 people utilize HoneyRock each year.

Due to Wheaton's membership in the Council for Christian Colleges & Universities, Wheaton students may also study at the Wycliffe Hall, Oxford, the Los Angeles Film Studies Center, Excelsia College in Australia, and Xi'an Foreign Language University in China. The CCCU also sponsors programs in American studies, Latin American studies, Middle Eastern studies, Russian studies, and journalism.

Campus

Wheaton's most recognizable and oldest building is Blanchard Hall, a limestone building built as the main College building in 1853. At the time, the College building was one of only two on campus, the other (called the "boarding hall") being a frame building at the foot of the hill crowned by the two-story building. Jonathan Blanchard had a vision for the expansion of this structure into its present castle-like architecture. Wheaton contends that it patterns its campus architecture after buildings at the University of Oxford which Blanchard admired on a trip to England in 1843. After four additions (1871, 1873, 1890, 1927), Wheaton completed the Main Building in 1927. That year, under college president J. Oliver Buswell, Jr., Wheaton renamed the Main Building Blanchard Hall to honor Wheaton's first two presidents, Jonathan Blanchard and his son Charles Blanchard.

Blanchard Hall served as a stop on the Underground Railroad.

Academic
In 1900, Wheaton built the brick "Industrial Building". From 1917–45 it housed the Wheaton Academy, and from 1945–60 the Graduate School. In 1960 it was renamed Buswell Hall, and in 1980 renamed Schell Hall in honor of Edward R. Schell.

Wheaton housed its science departments in Breyer (Chemistry) and Armerding (Biology, Geology, Math, and Physics) halls until the 2010–11 school year when Wheaton completed a new Meyer Science Center. Armerding Hall was also the home to the Wheaton College Observatory (a feature of the college since the presidency of Charles Blanchard in the late-nineteenth century), which Wheaton relocated to the Meyer Science Center.

The Wheaton College Conservatory of Music, housed in the Armerding Center for Music and Arts (previously in McAlister Hall and Pierce Memorial Chapel), is an internationally recognized music school and is the only conservatory within an Evangelical school of higher education. The approximately 200 students within the conservatory focus on various fields of music, including education, performance, composition, and history. Student recitals, required for graduation with a music degree, are held in the Armerding recital hall.

Athletics

Wheaton athletic teams are the Thunder. The college is a member of the Division III level of the National Collegiate Athletic Association (NCAA), primarily competing in the College Conference of Illinois and Wisconsin (CCIW) since the 1967–68 academic year; which they were a member on a previous stint from 1946–47 to 1959–60. The Thunder previously competed in the Illinois Intercollegiate Athletic Conference (IIAC) from 1919–20 to 1936–37.

Wheaton competes in 19 intercollegiate varsity sports: Men's sports include baseball, basketball, cross country, football, golf, soccer, swimming & diving, tennis, track & field, and wrestling; while women's sports include basketball, cross country, golf, soccer, softball, swimming & diving, tennis, track & field, and volleyball. Wheaton also competes in men's and women's collegiate rowing, lacrosse, and club soccer.

Accomplishments
The men's basketball team won the first NCAA Small College National Championship in 1958, defeating Kentucky Wesleyan in the finals, 89–65. The Wheaton men's soccer team captured the NCAA Division III Men's Soccer Championship in 1984 and 1997, to go with runner-up finishes in 1999, 2006, and 2014. The women's soccer team won the NCAA Division III Women's Soccer Championship in 2004, 2006, and 2007. Wheaton athletes competed in basketball at the 1904 Summer Olympics. The 1967–68 women's basketball team finished their season undefeated in 11 games, including a victory over the University of Iowa.

Gil Dodds (MA '48), the one-time world record holder for the indoor mile, NCAA cross country champion, and three-time Wanamaker Mile champion, coached men's track & field at Wheaton in the late 1940s and 1950s.

Football
The school's football team is coached by Mike Swider, who has taken the team to the NCAA Division III Football Championship playoffs nine times.

In 2008, Andy Studebaker was selected in the NFL Draft by the Philadelphia Eagles; he subsequently signed with the Kansas City Chiefs.

Rowing
Wheaton College Crew is the official collegiate rowing club of Wheaton College. Wheaton Crew was established in 1989 by a group of students, alumni, and donors competing with both men's and women's boats; both crews are members of the American Collegiate Rowing Association (ACRA) in the Great Lakes Region. The Wheaton College Crew is registered as a club sport affiliated with Wheaton College Thunder Athletics. The club program is currently the highest level of competitive rowing offered at Wheaton College.

The crew team rows on the Fox River from the dock of Fox Valley Christian Action's Riverwoods Campus in St. Charles, Illinois. The Fox is shared with the St. Charles Rowing Club (SCRC) on a residential, no-wake 7 km stretch of river. While no boathouse has been established due to complications with Wheaton College, Wheaton Crew hosts land practices, ergometer training and tryouts in the Chrouser Sports Complex on Wheaton's campus.

Wheaton Crew competes and trains for Head Races in the fall season and 2 km sprints in the spring. Wheaton competes in regattas including the Head of the Hooch, Head of the Charles Regatta and the John Hunter Regatta on Lake Lanier's Olympic Park and the Illinois Collegiate Rowing Invitational in Farmer City, Illinois. It does not compete on Sunday in agreement with Wheaton College and Wheaton College Thunder regulations.

The Wheaton Crew Cheer is a long-standing oral tradition of Wheaton oarsmen at the launch of Wheaton boats at regattas. As a strictly oral tradition, this cheer cannot be written down for any purpose. Memorizing the cheer is a rite of passage for Wheaton rowers.

At the transition of captains, both the Men's and Women's captains are given the first flag and oar of Wheaton Crew as a symbol of power passing from one generation of Wheaton rowers to another. The team introduced the Golden Cox-Tool in 2017 as a similar relic for the Head Coxswain's transition.

The 1939 hymn "Victory in Jesus" is sung at the end of every Wheaton Crew racing event following Wheaton College's affiliations as an Evangelical Christian establishment.

Facilities
Wheaton built a gymnasium, later renamed Adams Hall, in 1898. The college renovated it in early 2010 to house the Art Department.
Alumni Gymnasium (renamed the Edward A. Coray Alumni Gymnasium in 1968, in honor of Coach Ed Coray's long service), was built during the Edman presidency and paid for by alums. The college laid the cornerstone at homecoming on October 11, 1941. The college placed a copper box in the cornerstone containing a copy of the Wheaton Record, the Wheaton Daily Journal, a college catalog, a student directory, and a copy of the Homecoming program. Wyngarten Health Center was built in 1958, followed by Centennial Gymnasium in 1959–60, which was extensively renovated and expanded in 2000. Now known as King Arena, it is part of the Chrouser Sports Complex (CSC) and houses most of the college's athletic and fitness facilities.

Library and collections
The library, named after college trustee Robert E. Nicholas, opened in January 1952. In 1975 Buswell Memorial Library, named for the college's third president J. Oliver Buswell, Jr., was built adjacent to the Nicholas Library, and an interior corridor linked the two, creating the college's main library. The building also contains the Peter Stam Music Library, located downstairs and named in honor of the Conservatory of Music's first head, Peter Stam. Buswell Memorial Library's physical collections contain over one million items, making Buswell the largest library collection of liberal-arts colleges in  Illinois.
In September 2001, the Marion E. Wade Center, formerly housed in Buswell Library, moved to its new purpose-built home. Established in 1965 by professor of English Clyde S. Kilby, the Wade Center is an extensive research library and museum of the books and papers of seven British writers: C. S. Lewis, G. K. Chesterton, J. R. R. Tolkien, Owen Barfield, Dorothy L. Sayers, George MacDonald, and Charles Williams. The Wade Center has memorabilia of the Inklings, including C. S. Lewis's writing desk and a wardrobe from his childhood home constructed by his grandfather, widely thought to have inspired the Chronicles of Narnia series (although Westmont College also owns a wardrobe that once belonged to Lewis), Charles Williams's bookcases, J. R. R. Tolkien's writing desk where he wrote the entirety of The Hobbit and worked on The Lord of the Rings, and Pauline Baynes's original map of Narnia.

Buswell Library's special collections also include the archived correspondence, manuscripts, articles, photos, and other papers of Madeleine L'Engle, the Newbery Medal-winning author of A Wrinkle in Time. With items dating as early as 1919, the collection is composed largely of material sent to the college by L'Engle, supplemented with books and other supporting materials. The collection is the most comprehensive research center for L'Engle's work.

Campus buildings

Adams Hall – former gymnasium, houses Art Department, renovated building reopened in January 2009

Armerding Hall – former science building (Biology, Math/Computer Science, and Physics); annexed to Breyer Hall; named after the fifth president; in 2017, became dedicated as the new building for the Conservatory of Music
Beamer Center – student center (dining hall (Anderson Commons), college post office, student activities facilities, etc.)
Billy Graham Center – Advancement, evangelism programs, Billy Graham Center Archives, College Archives & Special Collections (a division of the college library), Barrows Auditorium, media resources, graduate school admissions and student services, academic departments (Biblical and Theological Studies, Christian Education/Christian Formation and Ministry, Communications, Intercultural Studies, Psychology); named after the famous alumnus
Blanchard Hall – President's Office, Provost's Office, Vice President of Finance, accounting, computing services, human resources, purchasing, academic departments (Education, English, History, Philosophy, Sociology/Anthropology); first College building; named after the first two presidents
Breyer Hall – former science building (Chemistry and Geology); annexed to Armerding Hall
Buswell Memorial Library – main stacks, music library, reference
Central Heating and Cooling Plant
Chase Service Center – public safety, physical plant (auto shop, lock shop, transportation center, etc.)
Edman Memorial Chapel – chapel auditorium and support space, 2009 renovation includes instrumental rehearsal room and instructional space for Conservatory of Music; named after the fourth president

Harbor House – executive retreat and conference center
Jenks Hall – Arena Theater, ROTC/Military Science
Marion E. Wade Center – Museum of CS Lewis and other Christian writers
McAlister Hall – Conservatory of Music, now under renovation.
Memorial Student Center (MSC) – former student center, renovated and reopened in January 2008, houses Business/Economics, Political Science/International Relations, and Urban Studies; named in honor of students who fought in World War II
Meyer Science Center – opened in 2010, houses all academic departments formerly housed in Armerding, Breyer, and CSC (all sciences).
North Harrison Hall – formerly the Wheaton Christian Grammar School, renovated to house Student Health Services, counseling center, and the wrestling gym
Pierce Chapel – Formerly the Conservatory of Music and Community School of the Arts, recital hall, now unused.
Schell Hall – HoneyRock office, foreign language offices, HNGR office
Chrouser Sports Complex (CSC) – Athletics, field house, pool, climbing wall, fitness center, indoor track
Student Services Building – bookstore, career services, financial aid, housing/residence life, registrar, student accounts, Student Development, undergraduate admissions
Westgate – Alumni Association; formerly the President's Home
Wyngarden – Department of Modern and Classical Languages, Global and Experiential Learning office

Residence halls

Smith-Traber Hall, on the east side of campus, houses first-year and sophomore men (Traber) and women (Smith)
Fischer Hall, on the north side of campus, houses first-year and sophomore men and women.
McManis-Evans Hall, overlooking the quad, houses sophomore, junior, and senior men and women
Williston Hall, built in the nineteenth century as the first separate residence hall, houses sophomore men and women

Other college-owned housing

College Avenue Apartments – Upper-class housing near the soccer and football fields
College Court Apartments – Upper-class housing south of the Beamer Center and west of the French House
Fellowship House – Upper-class female housing west of Traber Hall
French House – Upper-class male housing south of the Beamer Center
Graham House – Upper-class male housing West of the Graham Center
Hearth House – Upper-class female housing north of Buswell Library
Kay House – Upper-class male housing west of Traber Hall
Kilby House – Upper-class female housing northwest of Edman Chapel
Mathetai House – Upper-class housing west of Traber Hall
Saint & Elliot Apartments – Upper-class housing on the east of campus
Terrace Apartments – Upper-class housing on the far east of campus

Student life

Wheaton dedicated the Memorial Student Center (MSC) on June 11, 1951. The college built the center in memory of over 1,600 former students and graduates who served in World War II and in honor of those 39 who gave their lives. The center housed the Student Union Café, nicknamed "the Stupe" (which has since moved to the Beamer Center). An early pamphlet described the new building and listed some rules for its use, such as No Rook Playing and No Playing of Boogie-Woogie, Jazz, or Otherwise Abusing the Piano. The MSC was remodeled during the Fall semester of 2007 for academic use and is now home to the Business Economics department, the Political Science and International Relations department, and the Wheaton College Center for Faith, Politics, and Economics.

Wheaton remodeled the MSC according to the U.S. Green Building Council's Leadership in Energy and Environmental Design (LEED). The MSC was the first building renovated according to these standards and exceeded existing EPA standards. Many of the materials used were post-consumer, and over 20% of the materials were manufactured within a  radius of the College. The MSC remodeling is part of the current capital campaign, The Promise of Wheaton.

The Dining Hall (now the "Student Services Building") opened on January 4, 1953. Today it houses Student Development, Undergraduate Admissions, and the College Bookstore.

Jenks Hall is home to the Arena Theater, which was established in the Fall of 1974 and has staged over 100 full-length productions.

In the fall of 2004, the Todd M. Beamer Student Center opened. Beamer, a Wheaton alumnus, was part of a small group of passengers who stormed hijackers on United Flight 93, bringing down the plane in rural Pennsylvania during the September 11, 2001, attacks, and preventing it from reaching its target. The building that bears his name was a $20+ million project commissioned to meet the needs of the growing college community. Along with its spacious and sleek modern design, the Beamer Center features a convenience store known as the "C-Store", the "Stupe" (the name derives from students shortening the previous nickname for the campus Student Union, "Stupid Onion", which in turn is a jocular mispronunciation of Student Union), a bakery café named "Sam's" (named after the former Vice President of Student Development Sam Shellhammer, who retired following the 2007–08 school year after serving Wheaton's campus community for thirty years), several reading rooms and lounges, a recreation/game room, a prayer chapel, an expanded college post office, the offices for several organizations and departments, and several other event rooms. In the fall of 2006, intense rain storms created a flood that destroyed the lower level of the Beamer Center. Wheaton College has since restored the flood-damaged building.

The official student newspaper at Wheaton College is the Wheaton Record, a weekly publication with a circulation of 3400, in existence since 1876. The Record is produced by students, published by the college, and distributed each Friday after chapel free of charge. The Record was the recipient of the 2006 John David Reed General Excellence Award and has received 13 other awards from the Illinois College Press Association, of which it is a member. The Record is also a member of the Associated Collegiate Press.

In addition, Wheaton College has many organizations on campus that range from helping the poor and needy in Chicago to the arts and improvisation.

Juniors and seniors are also eligible to live in one of thirteen campus houses, apartments (five complexes), or off-campus.

Spirituality

The chapel, on the corner of Washington and Franklin streets, was dedicated on November 15, 1925. The college also used the building for commencements and other assemblies. In 1936–37, Wheaton renamed it the Orlinda Childs Pierce Memorial Chapel. Neighboring McAlister Hall was home to the Conservatory of Music and housed conservatory faculty offices.

College Church, across Washington Street from the college, is not formally associated with the college, although it has long been informally closely associated with the college.

The college holds regular chapel services in Edman Memorial Chapel, named for V. Raymond Edman, the fourth college president, which seats 2,400. Edman died in 1967 while speaking in chapel. He was preaching about being in the presence of the King, and the recording is available in the Wheaton chapel archives. The college also uses the chapel for many events of Wheaton's performing arts programs. In 2000, an entirely handcrafted organ made by the Casavant Organ Company of Quebec, Canada, was installed.

LGBT prohibition
Students and employees at Wheaton must sign a Community Covenant that classifies "homosexual behavior" as a form of immorality condemned by scripture which they must avoid. The college is listed among the least hospitable in the United States for LGBT students by Campus Pride and The Princeton Review because, among other reasons, the college featured an ex-gay movement speaker in a chapel service.

In 2014 Wheaton hired a gay Christian blogger, Julie Rodgers, as a ministry associate who could reach out to LGBT students while being committed to celibacy. Rodgers reports that college officials asked her not to identify herself as gay and to portray being gay only as a form of "brokenness" rather than something to be celebrated. Disappointed that she felt the college didn't accept a celibate gay person, Rodgers resigned from Wheaton in 2015.

Other

The building housing the Billy Graham Center (BGC), named after one of the college's most well-known graduates, opened in September 1980. The Billy Graham Center, the evangelist's corporate records repository, has existed since 1974.

The BGC houses an auditorium, classrooms, several evangelism institutes, a museum of the history of evangelism, the college's Archives and Special Collections, and the Wheaton College Graduate School. It also housed the school radio station, WETN 88.1 FM, until its sale in February 2017.

The Women's Building, renamed Williston Hall in 1930–31 (in honor of longtime Blanchard friend and donor J. P. Williston), was built in 1895. Its construction required the college to borrow $6,000. After seventy-eight years of housing only women, Williston Hall is now a coed dormitory for sophomore students. It opened to men starting in the fall semester of 2009 with the dream that it would become a creative hotspot on campus.

The President's House, or Westgate, formerly owned by college trustee John M. Oury, was presented to President Buswell on the tenth anniversary of his inauguration, April 23, 1936. The house served as the home of three of Wheaton's subsequent presidents. It now houses the Office of Alumni Relations.

In 1951, HoneyRock, Center for Leadership Development at Wheaton College, was established in Three Lakes, Wisconsin. HoneyRock is not only a year-round camp for young people, but it offers a variety of leadership schools and courses for students. Nearly 3000 people utilize HoneyRock each year.

Activism and controversy

Wheaton College has received criticism from both conservative and liberal alums. Wheaton's acceptance of evolutionary biology in the science departments has been controversial. Wheaton College was prominently featured in the 2001 PBS documentary Evolution, which showcased Wheaton professors' acceptance of theistic evolution. On issues of religion and science, the college believes that religious teachings about God and modern science are not at odds.

On October 13, 2007, Wheaton College's Stanton L. Jones signed interfaith document "Loving God and Neighbor Together: A Christian Response to A Common Word Between Us and You," agreeing that Islam and Christianity can be at peace with each other.

The school changed its nickname from the Crusaders to the Thunder in 2000, recognizing the image of a mounted Crusader as offensive and reminiscent of a controversial period in Christian history. The national press noted the change, and some alumni objected. Wheaton rejected other suggestions for a new mascot name, including the Mastodons — a reference to Perry Mastodon, which is a mastodon skeleton that was excavated nearby and is now on display on the college campus in the brand new science building. While still known by the nickname "Thunder", in 2010, the college officially changed its mascot to a mastodon named "Tor Thunder" to integrate the nickname and mascot.

Wheaton again appeared in the news in 2004 when it dismissed Joshua Hochschild, assistant professor of philosophy, for becoming Roman Catholic. Wheaton's president said his "personal desire" to retain Hochschild, "a gifted brother in Christ", was outweighed by his duty to employ "faculty who embody the institution's Protestant convictions". In 2008, English professor Kent Gramm resigned after declining to give the college administration details of his pending divorce from his wife of 30 years.

In 2011, a group of Wheaton alumni established OneWheaton, with the stated purpose of providing allied support to lesbian, gay, bisexual, transgender, and similar students and alums at Wheaton and other colleges. 

In July 2012, Wheaton College filed a lawsuit alongside The Catholic University of America in the U.S. District Court for the District of Columbia, opposing the Health and Human Services Preventative Services regulation. The regulation, promulgated under the Patient Protection and Affordable Care Act, would have required both institutions to provide access to emergency contraceptive drugs or pay fines.

In December 2015, Wheaton College suspended tenured professor of political science Larycia Hawkins, who wrote, "I stand in religious solidarity with Muslims because they, like me, a Christian, are people of the book. And as Pope Francis stated last week, we worship the same God". In explaining the decision to place Dr. Hawkins on administrative leave, the college referred to "significant questions regarding the theological implications" of her comments. The two officially parted ways in February 2016.

In March 2018, Charles Nagy, a former Wheaton College football player, sued the college and seven former teammates citing the school had attempted to cover up a hazing incident by his former teammates. In 2016, Nagy was kidnapped and beaten by his former teammates before being left on the baseball field in the middle of the night half-naked. Nagy was admitted into a nearby hospital and was diagnosed with two labrum tears requiring surgery. Despite the controversy, three players involved were allowed to compete in the next football game. Nagy alleged that the college administration was aware of the tradition of hazing on the team, but took no action. Wheaton faced additional controversy when it issued a public statement condemning hazing but hired a third-party investigator to discredit Nagy's account of the incident. Ultimately, all five players involved in the hazing pled guilty.

Notable alumni

Wheaton is also notable for graduating one of Illinois' first African-American college graduates, Edward Breathitte Sellers, in 1866.

Todd Beamer (Class of 1991)software salesperson & passenger on United Airlines Flight 93 during the September 11 attacks
Rob BellNY Times best-selling author (Love Wins), speaker, podcaster, and founder/former pastor of Mars Hill Bible Church in MI, (separate, distinct, and not to be confused with Mars Hill in Seattle.) In 2011, Time named Bell one of Time Magazine's 100 most influential people 
Suessa Baldridge Blaine (1860-1932), writer of temperance pageants
William Lane Craigapologist, professor of philosophy at Talbot School of Theology, author of the Kalam Cosmological Argument
Wesley Earl Craven (August 2, 1939 – August 30, 2015)prominent film director, writer, producer, and actor known for contributions to the horror genre
Bart D. Ehrman (October 5, 1955–)American New Testament scholar focusing on textual criticism of the New Testament, the historical Jesus, and the origins and development of early Christianity
Philip James "Jim" Elliot (October 8, 1927 – January 8, 1956)martyred missionary to Ecuador
Billy Graham (November 7, 1918 – February 21, 2018)prominent Christian evangelist
David IglesiasJudge Advocate (JAG), at the Pentagon, member of the legal team that was the inspiration for the film A Few Good Men, United States Attorney for the District of New Mexico
Robert W. Laneformer CEO of John Deere
Zac NiringiyeMasters in TheologyUgandan Anglican Bishop and activist
C. Herbert Olivercivil rights activist
Sophy Parfin – entomologist
John PiperReformed Baptist theologian and founder of the Christian hedonism movement
Robert Van Kampenfounder of mutual fund company Van Kampen Investments

References

Further reading

External links

 

 
1860 establishments in Illinois
Council for Christian Colleges and Universities
Educational institutions established in 1860
Evangelicalism in Illinois
Evangelical seminaries and theological colleges in the United States
Liberal arts colleges in Illinois
Nondenominational Christian universities and colleges
Universities and colleges in DuPage County, Illinois
Buildings and structures in Wheaton, Illinois
Populated places on the Underground Railroad
Evangelical universities and colleges in the United States
Private universities and colleges in Illinois